The Richard E. Bellman Control Heritage Award is an annual award (since 1979) given by the American Automatic Control Council (AACC) for achievements in control theory, named after the applied mathematician Richard E. Bellman. The award is given for "distinguished career contributions to the theory or applications of automatic control", and it is the "highest recognition of professional achievement for U.S. control systems engineers and scientists".

The original name was Control Heritage Award, and it was initially only given for the engineering side of control.

Recipients
The following individuals have received the AACC Richard E. Bellman Control Heritage Award:

 1979: Hendrik Wade Bode
 1980: Nathaniel B. Nichols
 1981: Charles Stark Draper
 1982: Irving Lefkowitz
 1983: John V. Breakwell
 1984: Richard E. Bellman
 1985: Harold Chestnut
 1986: John Zaborszky
 1987: John C. Lozier
 1988: Walter R. Evans
 1989: Roger W. Brockett
 1990: Arthur E. Bryson, Jr.
 1991: John G. Truxal
 1992: Rutherford Aris
 1993: Eliahu I. Jury
 1994: Jose B. Cruz, Jr.
 1995: Michael Athans
 1996: Elmer G. Gilbert
 1997: Rudolf E. Kálmán
 1998: Lotfi Asker Zadeh
 1999: Yu-Chi Ho
 2000: W. Harmon Ray
 2001: A.V. Balakrishnan
 2002: Petar V. Kokotovic
 2003: Kumpati S. Narendra
 2004: Harold J. Kushner
 2005: Gene F. Franklin
 2006: Tamer Başar
 2007: Sanjoy K. Mitter
 2008: Pravin Varaiya
 2009: George Leitmann
 2010: Dragoslav D. Šiljak
 2011: Manfred Morari
 2012: Arthur J. Krener
 2013: A. Stephen Morse
 2014: Dimitri Bertsekas
 2015: Thomas F. Edgar
 2016: Jason L. Speyer
 2017: John Baras
 2018: Masayoshi Tomizuka
 2019: Irena Lasiecka
 2020: Galip Ulsoy
 2021: Miroslav Krstić

See also

 List of people in systems and control
 List of engineering awards

References

 
Systems sciences awards